Frederica Mathewes-Green (born ) is an American author and speaker, chiefly on topics related to Eastern Orthodox belief and practice.

Mathewes-Green earned a MTS degree from Virginia Theological Seminary in 1977 and received an honorary Doctor of Letters from King University in 2019. She and her family converted to Orthodoxy from the Episcopal Church in 1993.

Mathewes-Green's writing about Orthodoxy has been described as having a humorous, storytelling style, and she has been referred to as "an Orthodox Garrison Keillor." She has authored ten books, and her writings have appeared in publications including The Washington Post, Christianity Today, and The Wall Street Journal.

Mathewes-Green is active in the pro-life movement, and she served as vice-president of Feminists for Life of America. She also served on the steering committee of the Common Ground Network for Life and Choice, an organization that brought anti-abortion and pro-choice partisans together in dialogue. 

Mathewes-Green is married to Rev. Gregory Mathewes-Green. The couple live in Johnson City, Tennessee. They have three grown children and fifteen grandchildren.

Books

 
 
 
 
 
 
 
 
  (originally titled The Lost Gospel of Mary)

References

Further reading

 
 

1952 births
American anti-abortion activists
American religious writers
Converts to Eastern Orthodoxy from Anglicanism
Greek Orthodox Christians from the United States
Living people
Members of the Greek Orthodox Church of Antioch
Women religious writers
Virginia Theological Seminary alumni
University of South Carolina alumni
20th-century American women writers
20th-century American non-fiction writers
American women non-fiction writers